Winners of the Pulitzer Prize in 2003 were:

Journalism awards

Letters, Drama and Music Awards

References

External links
 
 "The Pulitzer Prizes". The New York Times.
 "Washington Post and Los Angeles Times Each Win Three Pulitzer Prizes". The New York Times.
 "Letters, Drama and Music Awards". The New York Times.

Pulitzer Prizes by year
Pulitzer Prize
Pulitzer Prize
Pulitzer Prize, 2003